This page is a list of commercially available aircraft which may be registered under Recreational Aviation Australia rules.

Recreational aircraft

Microlights

Australia aviation-related lists